Dev (born Deepak Adhikari on 25 December 1982) is an Indian actor, producer, singer and screenwriter, known for his works in Bengali cinema, and more recently, a politician. He owns the production house Dev Entertainment Ventures Pvt. Ltd.. He is also one of the Highest Paid Bengali actors.

He made come back on the silver screen with Premer Kahini, opposite Koel Mullick, his first with whom he went on to star with in numerous films. A remake of the Kannada hit Mungaru Male, the film was moderately successful. Dev got another breakthrough in Challenge which opened to critical and commercial success. He received the Anandalok Awards for Best Actor and Best Action Hero for his performance in the film. He continued to garner commercial success and wider attention through his successful films, including Le Chakka, Dui Prithibi, Paglu, Challenge 2, Khoka 420, Rangbaaz and Chander Pahar.

He had been a recipient of numerous awards, namely Tele Cine Awards, Kalakar Awards, Filmfare Awards East, Filmfare Awards East (2017) & NABC International Bangla Film Award 2017. His accomplishments have made him one of the highest paid and sought out actors of Bengali cinema. Though he has delivered some critically acclaimed performances, Dev is often trolled for his poor accent, average acting skills, his winning of the Mahanayak Samman from the Government of West Bengal and his work as a politician. In 2022 he was awarded Banga Bhushan by the chief minister of West Bengal Mamata Banerjee.

Awards and nominations

See also
 Dev (Bengali actor) filmography

References

External links
 

Lists of awards received by Indian actor
Awards